St. Claret School, Kolkata was established in Debpukur, Barrackpore. The school follows the syllabus of the Council for the Indian School Certificate Examinations (CISCE). The principal is Fr.Sony John.

The school consists of two buildings, of which one is dedicated for nursery up to class 4 and the other building, which is the older one, has been dedicated for the students of class 5 up to class 12.

Apart from the playground and basketball court, a park, as well as a sprawling sitting area, has been dedicated for the students of the school.

See also
Education in India
List of schools in India
Education in West Bengal

References

Schools in Kolkata
Schools in North 24 Parganas district
Claretians
Educational institutions established in 2000
2000 establishments in West Bengal